Philometra lethrini is a species of parasitic nematode of fishes, first found off New Caledonia in the South Pacific, in the gonads of Lethrinus genivittatus. This species is characterized mainly by: length of spicules and length and structure of its gubernaculum; structure of male caudal end; body size; location in host and types of hosts.

References

Further reading

Moravec, František, et al. "Philometra spicarae sp. n.(Nematoda: Philometridae) from the abdominal cavity of the marine fish (picarel) Spicara smaris (Centracanthidae) off Sicily, Italy." Parasitology research 107.2 (2010): 399-402.
Moravec, František, and Jean-Lou Justine. "Two new gonad-infecting Philometra species (Nematoda: Philometridae) from the marine fish Lutjanus vitta (Perciformes: Lutjanidae) off New Caledonia." Folia Parasitologica 58.4 (2011): 302.

Camallanida
Parasitic nematodes of fish
Nematodes described in 2008